Bezhanovo may refer to the following places in Bulgaria:

Bezhanovo, Dobrich Province
Bezhanovo, Lovech Province